Sheykhi or Shaikhy female of Shaikh (Sheikh).
Daughter and Wife of Shaikh.

Sheykhi may refer to:
 Sheykhi, Fars
 Sheykhi, Rostam, Fars Province
 Sheykhi, Khuzestan
 Jamileh Sheykhi (1930–2001), Iranian actress